The list of German Federal Navy ships includes all ships commissioned into service with the Bundesmarine, the German navy which served West Germany during the Cold War from its foundation in 1956 through the unification of Germany in 1990, after which it was renamed German Navy (Deutsche Marine) in 1995. Dates listed are—with some exceptions—the years a given vessel was in commission.

See also the list of naval ships of Germany for naval ships throughout Germany's history.

Surface combatants

Destroyers
Type 119 — Fletcher class 
D170 Z1 (the former  (1959–72)
D171 Z2 (the former  (1959–81)
D172 Z3 (the former  (1959–80)
D178 Z4 (the former  (1959–81)
D179 Z5 (the former  (1960–82)
D180 Z6 (the former  (1960–67)
Type 101 — Hamburg-class destroyer
D181 Hamburg (1964–94)
D182 Schleswig-Holstein (1964–94)
D183 Bayern (1965–93)
D184 Hessen (1968–90)
Type 103 — Lütjens-class destroyer
D185 Lütjens (1969–2003)
D186 Mölders (1969–2003)
D187 Rommel (1970–1998)
Frigates
Hunt-class destroyers, classified as training frigates
Brommy (the former . Bought in 1950. Decommissioned in 1965)
Gneisenau (the former ) bought in 1958. Decommissioned in 1966)
Raule (the former . Bought in 1959. Decommissioned in 1967)
Type 138 (former Royal Navy modified Black Swan-class sloops)
F213 Scharnhorst (the former ) (1959–68)
F214 Hipper (the former ) (1959–67)
F215 Graf Spee (the former ) (1959–67)
F216 Scheer (the former ) (1959–71)
Type 120 Köln class
F220 Köln (1961–82)
F221 Emden (1961–83)
F222 Augsburg (1962–88)
F223 Karlsruhe (1962–84)
F224 Lübeck (1963–88)
F225 Braunschweig (1964–89)
Type 122 (Bremen-class frigate)
F207 Bremen (1982–2014)
F208 Niedersachsen (1982–2015)
F209 Rheinland-Pfalz (1983–2013)
F210 Emden (1983–2013)
F211 Köln (1983–2012)
F212 Karlsruhe (1984–2017) 
F213 Augsburg (1989– )
F214 Lübeck (1990– )

Amphibious warfare
Landing ships
Type 550 (s)
L750 Krokodil (former ) 1958–1976
L751 Eidechse (former ) 1958–1976
L752 Salamander (former ) 1958–1970
L753 Viper (former ) 1958–1970
Type 551 (s)
L754 Otter (former  (ex )) 1958–1971
L755 Natter (former  (ex )) 1958–1971

ex-LST-987 (former ) 1961–1964
ex-LST-1041 (former ) 1961–1964
Landing craft
Type 520 
L760 Flunder 
L761 Karpfen
L762 Lachs
L763 Plötze
L764 Rochen
L765 Schlei 
L766 Stör
L767 Tümmler
L768 Wels
L769 Zander 
L788 Butt
L789 Brasse
L790 Barbe
L791 Delphin 
L792 Dorsch
L793 Felchen 
L794 Forelle
L795 Inger
L796 Makrele
L797 Muräne 
L798 Renke 
L799 Salm 

28 craft: LCM 1–28

10 craft: LCA 1–10

LCU 1 (ex-L7981; former //) 1958–1968

Small Surface Combatants
Submarine chaser
Type 179 (Le Fougueux class submarine chaser)
UW12 (former USS P1618 1957–1970
Corvettes
Type 420 Thetis class corvette
P6052 Thetis 1960–91
P6053 Hermes 1960–92
P6054 Najade 1961–91
P6055 Triton 1961–92
P6056 Theseus 1962–92
Hans Burkner class corvette
A1449 Hans Burkner 1963–??
Fast attack craft
Type 140/141 (Jaguar class fast attack craft/Seeadler class fast attack craft)
P6058 Iltis (S 2) 1957–1978
P6059 Jaguar (S 1) 1957–1976
P6060 Leopard (S 5) 1958–1975
P6061 Luchs (S 4) 1958–1975
P6062 Wolf (S 3) 1958–1975
P6063 Tiger (S 23) 1958–1976
P6064 Panther (S 24) 1958–1978
P6065 Löwe (S 12) 1959–1975
P6066 Fuchs (S 13) 1959–1978
P6067 Marder (S 14) 1959–1975
P6068 Seeadler (S 6) 1958–1977
P6069 Albatros (S 7) 1959–1977
P6070 Kondor (S 8) 1959–1977
P6071 Greif (S 9) 1959–1976
P6072 Falke (S 10) 1959–1976
P6073 Geier (S 11) 1959–1976
P6074 Bussard (S 25) 1959–1976
P6075 Habicht (S 26) 1959–1977
P6076 Sperber (S 27) 1959–1976
P6077 Kormoran (S 28) 1959–1977
P6082 Weihe (S 15) 1959–1973
P6083 Kranich (S 16) 1959–1974
P6084 Alk (S 29) 1960–1976
P6085 Storch (S 17) 1960–1975
P6086 Pelikan (S 30) 1960–1975
P6087 Häher (S 18) 1960–1976
P6088 Elster (S 19) 1960–1978
P6089 Reiher (S 20) 1960–1976
P6090 Pinguin (S 22) 1961–1975
P6091 Dommel (S 21) 1961–1978
Type 142 (Zobel class fast attack craft)
P6092 Zobel (S 31) 1961–1982
P6093 Wiesel (S 32) 1962–1984
P6094 Dachs (S 33) 1962–1983
P6095 Hermelin (S 38) 1962–1983
P6096 Nerz (S 34) 1963–1982
P6097 Puma (S 39) 1962–1981
P6098 Gepard (S 35) 1963–1982
P6099 Hyäne (S 40) 1963–1984
P6100 Frettchen (S 36) 1963–1983
P6101 Ozelot (S 37) 1963–1984
Type 149 (Silbermöwe class fast attack craft)
P6052 Silbermöwe (ex-Silver Gull) 1956–1968
P6053 Sturmmöwe (ex-Storm Gull ) 1956–1968
P6054 Wildschwan (ex-Wild Sawn) 1956–1968
P6055 Eismöwe (ex-S 1) 1956–1968
P6056 Raubmöwe (ex-S 2) 1956–1968
P6057 Seeschwalbe 1957–1974
Former Kriegsmarine S-boat fast attack craft
UW10 (former Kriegsmarine S 130) 1957–1993
UW11 (former Kriegsmarine S 208 1957–1964
S116 (Kriegsmarine name retained) 1957–1965
Type 152 Hugin class fast attack craft (Nasty type, from Norway)
P6191 Hugin 1960–1964
P6192 Munin 1960–1964
Type 153 fast attack craft (Vosper type, from Britain)
P6193 Pfeil 1962–1967
P6194 Strahl 1962–1967
Type 143 (Albatros class fast attack craft)
P6111 Albatros (S 61) 1974–
P6112 Falke (S 62) 1974–
P6113 Geier (S 63) 1974–
P6114 Bussard (S 64) 1975–
P6115 Sperber (S 65) 1974–
P6116 Greif (S 66) 1975–
P6117 Kondor (S 67) 1975–
P6118 Seeadler (S 68) 1976–
P6119 Habicht (S 69) 1975–
P6120 Kormoran (S 70) 1976–
Type 143A (Gepard class fast attack craft)
P6121 Gepard (S 71) 1982–
P6122 Puma (S 72) 1982–
P6123 Hermelin (S 73) 1983–
P6124 Nerz (S 74) 1982–
P6125 Zobel (S 75) 1982–
P6126 Frettchen (S 76) 1983–
P6127 Dachs (S 77) 1983–
P6128 Ozelot (S 78) 1984–
P6129 Wiesel (S 79) 1984–
P6130 Hyäne (S 80) 1984–
Motor launches
Former Kriegsmarine R-boat small minesweepers
Y870 UW 4 (Former Kriegsmarine R 101) 1956–1981
W47 UW 5 (Former Kriegsmarine R 150) 1956–1979
W48 UW 6 (Former Kriegsmarine R 408) 1956–1977
W52 OT 1 (i) (Former Kriegsmarine R 406) 1956–1960
W61 AT 1 (i) (Former Kriegsmarine R 266) 1957–1968
W62 AT 2 (Former Kriegsmarine R 407) 1957–1963
W-- OT 1 (ii) (Converted motor minesweeper Jupiter (M1065), former Kriegsmarine R 137)
W-- AT 1 (ii) (Converted motor minesweeper Regulus (M1055), former Kriegsmarine R 142)
Patrol trawlers
Type 139 patrol trawler (Former British Isles class trawler)
A50 Eider (Former  (T287)
A51 Trave (Former  (T286)
KW1 class patrol trawler (Former Kriegsmarine KFK type patrol trawler)
W1 KW 1 (Former Kriegsmarine V 1441) 1956–1968
Y828 KW 2 (Former Kriegsmarine M 3253) 1956–1975
Y829 KW 3 (Former Kriegsmarine K 566 1956–??
W4 KW 4 (Former Kriegsmarine ??) 1956–1964
W5 KW 5 (Former Kriegsmarine ??) 1956–1964
Y836 KW 6 (Former Kriegsmarine ??) 1956–1976
W7 KW 7 (Former Kriegsmarine ??) 1956–1967
Y831 KW 8 (Former Kriegsmarine ??) 1956–1975
W9 KW 9 (Former Kriegsmarine ??) 1956–1964
W10 KW 10 (Former Kriegsmarine ??) 1956–1964
Patrol craft
KW11 class patrol craft (Former Frontier Guard craft)
KW 11 (ex-P 1) 1956–??
KW 12 (ex-P 2) 1956–??
KW 13 (ex-P 3) 1956–??
KW 14 (ex-P 4) 1956–??
Type 369 KW15 class patrol craft (Former Labor Service Unit craft)
Y827 KW 15 (ex-USN 54) 1956–??
Y830 KW 16 (ex-USN 55) 1956–??
Y845 KW 17 (ex-USN 56) 1956–??
Y832 KW 18 (ex-USN 57) 1956–??
Y833 KW 19 (ex-USN 58) 1956–1981
Y846 KW 20 (ex-USN 59) 1956–??
BG1 class patrol craft (former Type 369 KW 15 class patrol craft)
BG1  ----  (ex-KW 15)
BG2  ----  (ex-KW 16)
BG3  ----  (ex-KW 17)
BG4  ----  (ex-KW 19)
BG11 type Neustadt class patrol craft
BG11 Neustadt 1969–
BG12 Bad Bramstadt 1969–
BG13 Uelzen 1969–
BG14 Duderstadt 1969–
BG15 Eschwege 1969–
BG16 Alsfeld 1970–
BG17 Bayreuth 1970–
BG18 Rosenheim 1970–
Air-sea rescue boats
Type 909 FL5 class air sea rescue boat
FL5  --  (ex-KW 11, former P 1)
FL6  --  (ex-KW 12, former P 2)
FL7  --  (ex-KW 13, former P 3)
FL8  --  (ex-KW 14, former P 4)

Subsurface combatants
Submarines
Type 240 submarine
S170 Hai (former Kriegsmarine U2365) 1956–1966
S171 Hecht (former Kriegsmarine U2367) 1957–1969
Type 241 submarine
Y888 Wilhelm Bauer (former Kriegsmarine U2549) 1960–1983
Type 201 submarine
S180 U-1 1962–1966
S181 U-2 1962–1963
S182 U-3 1963–1967
Type 202 submarine (experimental)
S172 Hans Techel 1965–1966
S173 Friedrich Schürer 1965–1966
Type 205 submarine
S183 U-4 1962–1974
S184 U-5 1962–1974
S185 U-6 1963–1974
S186 U-7 1963–1974
S187 U-8 1963–1974
S188 U-9 1966–1993
S189 U-10 1967–1993
S190 U-11 1968–??
S191 U-12 1968–??
S180 U-1 1967–1991
S181 U-2 1966–1992
Type 206 submarine—later upgraded to Type 206A submarine
S192 U-13 1973–
S193 U-14 1973–
S194 U-15 1973–
S195 U-16 1973–
S196 U-17 1973–
S197 U-18 1973–
S198 U-19 1973–
S199 U-20 1973–
S170 U-21 1974–
S171 U-22 1974–
S172 U-23 1974–
S173 U-24 1974–
S174 U-25 1974–
S175 U-26 1974–
S176 U-27 1974–
S177 U-28 1975–
S178 U-29 1974–
S179 U-30 1975–

Mine warfare
 Minelayers
Type 370 (Bamberg class minelayer)
N120 Bochum (former  (LST 1089)) 1961–1976
N121 Bottrup (former  (LST 1101)) 1961–1976
A1403 Bamberg (former  (LST 799)) 1961–1970
Type 762 (Sachsenwald class mine transport/minelayer)
A1437 Sachsenwald 1967–??
A1438 Steigerwald 1967–??
 Ocean Minesweepers
Type 319 (Former Kriegsmarine M class minesweeper)
F207 Biene (Former Kriegsmarine M 205, Type 1935) 1956–1974
F208 Bremse (Former Kriegsmarine M 253, Type 1935) 1956–1976
F209 Brummer (Former Kriegsmarine M 85, Type 1935) 1956–1974
F210 Hummel (Former Kriegsmarine M 81, Type 1935) 1956–1976
F211 Wespe (Former Kriegsmarine M 24, Type 1935) 1956–1973
M187 Seehund (Former Kriegsmarine M 388, Type 1940) 1956–1973
M188 Seeigel (Former Kriegsmarine M 460, Type 1940) 1956–1973
M189 Seelöwe (Former Kriegsmarine M 441, Type 1940) 1956–1969
M190 Seepferd (Former Kriegsmarine M 294, Type 1940) 1956–1966
M191 Seeschlange (Former Kriegsmarine M611, Type 1943) 1956–1967
M192 Seestern (Former Kriegsmarine M 278, Type 1940) 1956–1966
 Coastal Minesweepers
Type 320 (Lindau class minesweeper)
Later upgraded to Type 331B minehunter:
M1070 Göttingen 1958–
M1071 Koblenz 1958–
M1072 Lindau 1958–
M1074 Tübingen 1958–
M1075 Wetzlar 1958– 
M1077 Weilheim 1959– 
M1078 Cuxhaven 1959– 
M1080 Marburg 1959– 
M1085 Minden 1960– 
M1087 Völklingen 1960– 
Later upgraded to Type 351 control ship (for 'Troika' minesweeping drones):
M1073 Schleswig 1958–
M1076 Paderborn 1958–
M1079 Düren 1959–
M1081 Konstanz 1959–
M1082 Wolfsburg 1959–
M1083 Ulm 1959–
Later upgraded to Type 331A minehunter:
M1084 Flensburg 1959–
M1086 Fulda 1960–
Type 321 (Vegesack class minesweeper)
M1250 Vegesack 1959–1975
M1251 Hameln 1959–1975
M1252 Detmold 1960–1975
M1253 Worms 1960–1975
M1254 Siegen 1960–1975
M1255 Passau 1960–1978
 Inshore minesweepers
Type 340 (Krebs class minesweeper)
M1050 Mira 1960–1978
M1051 Castor 1962–1990
M1052 Krebs 1959–1976
M1053 Orion 1961–1979
M1054 Pollux 1961–1992
M1055 Sirius 1961–1990
M1056 Rigel 1962–1990
M1057 Regulus 1962–1990
M1058 Mars 1960–1992
M1059 Spica 1960–1992
Type 341 (Schütze class minesweeper)
M1060 Skorpion 1963–??
M1061 Stier 1958–??
M1062 Schütze 1958–??
M1063 Waage 1963–??
M1064 Deneb 1961–??
M1065 Jupiter 1961–??
M1066 Pegasus 1962–1974
M1067 Altair 1961–??
M1068 Algol 1963–1973
M1069 Wega 1962–??
M1090 Perseus 1960–??
M1091 Steinbock 1958–??
M1092 Pluto 1960–??
M1093 Neptun 1960–??
M1094 Widder 1959–??
M1095 Herkules 1960–??
M1096 Fische 1959–??
M1097 Gemma 1959–??
M1098 Capella 1960–1976
M1099 Uranus 1960–1973
Type 390 (Holnis class minesweeper)
M---- Holnis 1966–??
Type 391 (Niobe class minesweeper)
M---- Niobe 1957–??
Type 392 (Hansa class minesweepers)
M---- Hansa 1958–??
Type 393 (Ariadne class minesweeper)
M2650 Ariadne 1960–??
M2651 Freya 1960–??
M2652 Vineta 1960–??
M2653 Hertha 1961–??
M2654 Nymphe 1962–??
M2655 Nixe 1962–??
M2656 Amazone 1963–??
M2657 Gazelle 1963–??
Type 394 (Frauenlob-class minesweeper)
M2658 Frauenlob 1966–2002
M2659 Nautilus 1966–1994
M2660 Gefion 1967–2002
M2661 Medusa 1967–2001
M2662 Undine 1967–2001
M2663 Minerva 1967–1995
M2664 Diana 1967–1995
M2665 Loreley 1968–2002
M2666 Atlantis 1968–1995
M2667 Acheron 1969–1995
Motor minesweepers
Type 359 motor minesweeper (Former Kriegsmarine R-boat motor minesweeper—Most later redesignated as Type 730 accommodation minesweepers)
M1050 Capella (Former Kriegsmarine R 133) 1956–1972
M1051 Castor (Former Kriegsmarine R 138) 1956–1958
M1052 Mars (Former Kriegsmarine R 136) 1956–1967
M1053 Orion (Former Kriegsmarine R 132) 1956–1968
M1054 Pollux (Former Kriegsmarine R 140) 1956–1970
M1055 Regulus (Former Kriegsmarine R 142) 1956–1968
M1056 Rigel (Former Kriegsmarine R 135) 1956–1967
M1057 Saturn (Former Kriegsmarine R 146) 1956–1972
M1058 Sirius (Former Kriegsmarine R 144) 1956–1971
M1059 Spica (Former Kriegsmarine R 247) 1956–1970
M1060 Aldebaran (Former Kriegsmarine R 91) 1956–1972
M1061 Algol (Former Kriegsmarine R 99) 1956–1970
M1062 Arkturus (Former Kriegsmarine R 128) 1956–1968
M1063 Altair (Former Kriegsmarine R 76) 1956–1970
M1064 Deneb (Former Kriegsmarine R 127) 1956–1968
M1065 Jupiter (Former Kriegsmarine R 137) 1956–1969
M1066 Merkur (Former Kriegsmarine R 134) 1956–1970
M1067 Pegasus (Former Kriegsmarine R 68) 1956–1970
M1068 Skorpion (Former Kriegsmarine R 120) 1956–1974
M1069 Wega (Former Kriegsmarine R 67) 1956–1966

Auxiliary ships
 Tenders
Type 401 (Rhein class fast attack tender craft tender)
A58 Rhein 1960–??
A61 Elbe 1960–??
A62 Weser 1960–1976
A63 Main 1960–??
A64 Ruhr 1960–1976
A66 Neckar 1961–??
A68 Werra 1963–??
A69 Donau 1961–??
Type 402 (Mosel class fast minesweeper tender)
A54 Isar 1962–1982
A65 Saar 1961–1991
A67 Mosel 1961–??
Type 403 (Lahn class submarine tender)
A55 Lahn 1962–??
A56 Lech 1962–??
 Repair ships
Type 726 (Odin class repair ship)
A512 Odin (former  (ARB 9/LST 967)) 1962–??
A513 Wotan (former  (ARB 11/LST 1119)) 1962–??
 Replenishment ships/oilers
Type 701 (Lüneburg class replenishment ship)
A1411 Lüneburg
A1412 Coburg
A1413 Freiburg 
A1414 Glücksburg
A1415 Saarburg
A1416 Nienburg
A1417 Offenburg
A1418 Meersburg 
Type 706 (Schwarzwald class replenishment ship)
A1400 Schwarzwald
Training ships
Type 440 (Deutschland class training ship)
German naval ship Deutschland (A59)
Gorch Fock type
Gorch Fock sail training vessel

References

 Robert Gardiner (ed. dir.), Conway's All the World's Fighting Ships 1947–1982, Part I. London: Conway Maritime Press, 1983.
 Francis E. McMurtrie and Raymond V.B.  Blackman (eds.), Jane's Fighting Ships 1949–50. New York: The McGraw-Hill Book Company, Inc., 1949.
 Eberhard Möller and Werner Brack, The Encyclopedia of U-boats. From 1904 to the present. London: Greenhill Books, 2004.

Lists of ships of Germany
Cold War naval ships of Germany

de:Liste von Kriegsschiffen (Deutschland seit 1945)